This article displays the qualifying draw of the 2011 Kremlin Cup.

Players

Seeds

Qualifiers

Qualifying draw

First qualifier

Second qualifier

Third qualifier

Fourth qualifier

References
 Qualifying draw

2011 - Men's qualifying
Kremlin Cup - qualifying